There are at least 35 named lakes and reservoirs in Phillips County, Arkansas.

Lakes
Allen Lake, el.  
Beaver Pond, el.  
Brushy Lake, el.  
Cargo Slash, el.  
Chaney Lake, el.  
Chute of Island 68, el.  
Cober Lake, el.  
Dustin Pond, el.  
Eagle Nest Lake, el.  
Flag Lake, el.  
Flat Lake, el.  
Forked Lake, el.  
Hornor Neck, el.  
Horseshoe Lake, el.  
Jentry Lake, el.  
Lacy Lake, el.  
Lake Bayou, el.  
Little Cypress Lake, el.  
Long Lake, el.  
Long Lake, el.  
Long Lake, el.  
Lost Lakes, el.  
Lower Taylor Lake, el.  
 Old Town Lake, el.  
 Porter Lake, el.  
 Round Lake, el.  
 Steelman Lake, el.  
 Swan Lake, el.  
 Tupelo Lake, el.  
 Upper Taylor Lake, el.  
 Willow Lake, el.  
 Willow Lake, el.

Reservoirs
Heritage Hill Pond, el.  
Jake Lake, el.  
 Storm Creek Lake, el.

See also
 List of lakes in Arkansas

Notes

Bodies of water of Phillips County, Arkansas
Phillips